Recumbent stone circles are found in Aberdeenshire in northeast Scotland. Their most striking characteristic is that in the general direction of south-southwest there is a large stone lying on its side with its length lining up with the perimeter of the circle. Thought to have been from the Bronze Age, their unusual design, and the possibility of being associated with astronomical observations, has attracted several surveys starting at the beginning of the 20th century. 

In 2011 the Royal Commission on the Ancient and Historical Monuments of Scotland published an authoritative book on this type of monument and produced an online gazetteer. Since publication, two other recumbent stone circles have been identified by archaeologists.

Surveys including recumbent stone circles

The particular characteristic of recumbent stone circles is that, as well as being a ring of upright stones (orthostats), they have a large stone lying on its side along the perimeter of the circle towards south to southwest. On both sides are particularly tall orthostats. The recumbent stone and flankers, as they are called, together form the recumbent setting. Around the ring the orthostats get progressively lower in height and more closely spaced until they reach the opposite side from the setting. These stone circles contain a low central ring cairn surrounded by comparatively small kerb stones.

Thought to have been built in the Bronze Age, over the millennia many of these circles have become ruinous, being particularly vulnerable in the 18th and 19th centuries due to agricultural improvement, so many stones have fallen or been taken away and, indeed, only about half of the circles show any signs of a cairn without archaeological excavation. 

As early as 1527 Hector Boece was writing about the stone circles in Scottorum Historia. Until the mid 19th century these circles, when they were noticed at all, were spoken of as being "Druidical Temples" or similar epithets and it was Frederick Coles who was the first person to carry out a systematic survey which he published in an annual series of papers from 1900 to 1907 in the Proceedings of the Society of Antiquaries of Scotland. Although Coles was careful and cautious in his identifications, he sometimes made misidentifications of circles in a ruinous condition. Somewhat similar stone circles were later found in the far southwest of Ireland where they were originally called recumbent stone circles until significant differences led to them becoming called "Cork–Kerry stone circles" and later axial stone circles.

As part of their wider interest in northern European stone circles, the northeast Scotland circles attracted Alexander Thom, Aubrey Burl and Clive Ruggles who catalogued them as part of their investigations into whether the recumbent setting could in some way be shown to have an astronomical significance. Those identified as recumbent stone circles all were found in the traditional counties of Aberdeenshire (historic county) and Kincardineshire (with a very few just over the borders into Angus, and Banffshire). In current terms except for two they are all in the Aberdeenshire council area. In 2011 the Royal Commission on the Ancient and Historical Monuments of Scotland (RCAHMS) published an authoritative book, on recumbent stone circles specifically. The RCAHMS also issued an online gazetteer giving details of each monument that listed 71 as confirmed being recumbent and another 85 as not belonging in this category.

List of circles categorised as recumbent by RCAHMS

Recently classified recumbent stone circles

In 2013 a site at Hillhead was excavated and found to be a recumbent stone circle. The site had been noticed in 1998 but was thought to have been the location of the remains of a roundhouse. The excavation uncovered the sockets for two flankers and a depression in the ground where the recumbent probably lay. Nether Coullie stone circle was listed in the 2011 RCAHS gazetteer as not being a recumbent stone circle but following careful inspection of archive records and another site inspection it was reclassified in 2015. 
Other stone circles investigated recently, but which have found to be modern, include Mill of Birkenbower and Holmhead.

See also
 List of axial multiple-stone circles
 List of axial five-stone circles

Notes for table

Notes for introduction

References

Citations

Works cited
 – available online

 – the 2005 edition sems the same but with an additional appendix

 

 

 

 – only published online

 

List of recumbent stone circles
Prehistoric sites in Scotland
Recumbent circles, list of
Lists of stone circles in Scotland